Antonio Álvarez Giráldez (born 10 April 1955) is a Spanish former football central defender and manager.

Playing career
Born in Marchena, Seville, and a product of hometown Sevilla FC's youth system, Álvarez made his La Liga debut during the 1975–76 season, scoring once in eight games as the team finished in 11th position. In the following decade he would be more often than not an undisputed starter for the Andalusians, eventually playing 370 matches all competitions comprised.

At the end of the 1987–88 campaign, still with Sevilla in the top division, the 33-year-old Álvarez – having made just 17 league appearances – opted to move on, and signed with neighbouring CD Málaga. In summer 1991 he joined another club in the region, Segunda División B's Granada CF, eventually retiring at the age of 40.

Coaching career
After retiring, Álvarez eventually worked again with main club Sevilla, serving as assistant under several coaches, the first Joaquín Caparrós in 2000. He was part of Juande Ramos' staff as they won two consecutive UEFA Cups and one Copa del Rey, amongst other accolades.

In March 2010, after roughly two years as Sevilla's director of football, Álvarez replaced former teammate Manolo Jiménez as first-team manager following his dismissal, after Luis Aragonés, recently departed from Beşiktaş JK, declined an offer to coach the side. He led the team throughout the last ten fixtures of the season, winning six, losing four and robbing RCD Mallorca of the fourth place which qualified for the UEFA Champions League in the last minute of the last matchday, a 3–2 away win against neighbours UD Almería.

On 19 May 2010, Álvarez was also on the bench as Sevilla won the Spanish Cup, with goals from youth graduates Diego Capel and Jesús Navas (2–0). Four months later, following two losses and one draw in three games (two in the league and one in the UEFA Europa League), he was sacked.

Managerial statistics

Honours

Manager
Copa del Rey: 2009–10
Supercopa de España runner-up: 2010

References

External links

1955 births
Living people
People from Campiña de Morón y Marchena
Sportspeople from the Province of Seville
Spanish footballers
Footballers from Andalusia
Association football defenders
La Liga players
Segunda División players
Segunda División B players
Sevilla Atlético players
Sevilla FC players
CD Málaga footballers
Granada CF footballers
Spain amateur international footballers
Spain B international footballers
Spanish football managers
La Liga managers
Sevilla FC managers
Sevilla FC non-playing staff